Levelland Mountain is the highest point in the Raven Cliffs Wilderness in Lumpkin and Union counties, Georgia.  The mountain is traversed by the Appalachian Trail and is in the Chattahoochee National Forest. The summit is the tenth-highest peak in the Union County.

Notes 

Mountains of Lumpkin County, Georgia
Mountains of Georgia (U.S. state)
Mountains of Union County, Georgia
Chattahoochee-Oconee National Forest